Dental instruments are tools that dental professionals use to provide dental treatment. They include tools to examine, manipulate, treat, restore, and remove teeth and surrounding oral structures.

Examination instruments
These tools allow dental professionals to manipulate tissues for better visual access during treatment or during dental examination.

Dental mirror

The dentist or dental auxiliary use dental mirrors to view a mirror image of the teeth in locations of the mouth where visibility is difficult or impossible. They also are used for reflecting light onto desired surfaces, and for retraction of soft tissues to improve access or vision.

Probes
Dental explorer (sickle probe)
Periodontal probe

Retractors

Cheek retractor
Dental mirror
Lip retractor
Mouth prop
Tongue retractor

Local anesthesia
Dental anesthesia and dental syringe

Anesthesia is broken down into three main categories: local, regional, and general, all of which affect the nervous system in some way and can be administered using various methods and different medications.

Local anesthesia is an anesthetic drug (which can be given as a shot, spray, or ointment) that numbs only a small, specific area of the body (for example, a foot, hand, or patch of skin). With local anesthesia, a person is awake while sedated. Local anesthesia lasts for a short period of time and is often used for minor outpatient procedures (when patients come in for surgery and can go home that same day). For someone having outpatient surgery in a clinic or doctor's office (such as the dentist or dermatologist), this anesthetic is likely used. The medicine can numb the area during the procedure and for a short time afterwards to help control post-surgery discomfort.

The function of this instrument involves successfully piercing the surface of the periodontal ligament so the patient can be distributed the anesthesia. Past devices have proven to be insufficient because it instilled fear in patients and made it exhaustingly uncomfortable for dentists to use because of the bulky size. With how simple it is to hide it in the hand due to the smaller size of modern day anesthetic syringes, dentists are successfully able to maneuver in a patient's mouth without causing harm to the patient being treated, allowing for a quick insert of the anesthesia followed by the dentist being able move on swiftly to the next task of the dental visit. Another aspect of the syringe is the capability of use, which means dentists are able to easily insert fluid in the device and follow the color coded instructions that allow for efficient use of the dental instrument. The device is so intricately sized that doctors are able to grip it well enough to get the job done. Some anesthetic syringes also include a power handle that gives the doctor less of a responsibility over the amount of pressure needed to push in the medicine because the power handle has settings that let the dentist set an amount for how much anesthetic they want to be produced.

Dental handpieces

Dental handpieces come in many various types which include: High-speed air driven (also known as an airotor), slow-speed, friction grip, and surgical handpiece.

Dental laser
A dental laser is a type of laser designed specifically for use in oral surgery or dentistry.

The use of a laser can decrease morbidity after surgery, and reduces the need for anesthetics. Because of the cauterization of tissue there will be little bleeding following soft tissue procedures, and some risks of alternative electrosurgery procedures are avoided.

Dental torque wrench
A dental torque wrench or restorative torque wrench is a torque wrench used to precisely apply a specific torque to a fastener screw for fixation of an abutment, dentures, or prosthetics on a dental implant.

Burs
The cutting surfaces of dental burs are made of a multi-fluted tungsten carbide, a diamond coated tip, or a stainless steel multi-fluted rosehead.
There are many types and classifications of burs. Some of the most common are: the round bur (sizes ¼ to 10) or inverted cone (sizes 33½ to 90L).
Burs are also classified by the type of shank. For instance a latch type, or right angle bur, is only used in the slow speed handpiece with contra-angle attachment. Long shank or shaft is only used in the slow speed when the contra-angle is not in use, and finally a friction grip bur, which is a small bur, is used only in the high-speed handpiece.

There are many bur shapes that are utilized in various specific procedures.

Operative burs
Flat fissure, pear-shaped, football, round, tapered, flame, chamfer, bevel, end cut, bud bur, steel, inverted cone, diamond, brown stone, and green-stone

Restorative instruments

Excavators
Spoon excavator: Used to remove soft carious decay
Half hollenbach: Used to test for overhangs or flash
Dental hatchers: Used to widen the entrance of the tooth cavity and slice away the thin carious enamel
Chisels:
Straight - bevels the cavosurface margin and used in 3, 4, and 5 classifications of cavities on the maxillary
Wedelstaedt - only used in the anterior for classes 3, 4, and 5
Bin Angle - this is held in a pen grasp and used for class 2 maxillary only

Burnishers
Burnishers are used for polishing and contouring amalgam fillings and to polish composite fillings. They include:
Ball burnisher
Beavertail burnisher
Cone burnisher
Flat plastic
Pear shaped burnisher

Pluggers
Pluggers are also known as amalgam condensers. They are used to achieve a well-condensed filling by compressing the filling material into the cavity and applying pressure.
Amalgam plugger
49 plugger

Periodontal instruments

Fine scalers
Fine scalers are used in the removal of soft deposits. They include:
Drury scalers
Fine excavators
MF 4/5

Heavy scalers
These are seen as the scalers used in the removal for heavy tartar and stains which are not removed by the fine scalers. They include:
American pattern B
Cushion scaler
Excavator
Hoe scaler
Jacquette 1
Jacquette 2
Jacquette 3
Scaler 152

Curettes

Types include:
Gracey curettes - semicircle tipped, but one edge lower than the other. It is used at 70° to the tooth root surface.
Universal curettes - these have a semicircular tip used at 90° to the tooth root surface.

Prosthodontic instruments

Removable prosthodontics
Articulators
Blow torch
Bunsen burner
Calipers
Face bow
Fox plane
Glass mixing slab
Lecrons carver
Mixing bowls
Spatulas for mixing dental plaster
Spatulas for mixing impression materials
Wax carver
Wax knife
Wax spatula
Willis gauge

Extraction and surgical instruments

Dental forceps
Ancient Greek and Roman dentists extracted teeth with lead pliers. In 1840, Sir John Tomes and his friend Evrard made the first pair of dental forceps. In 1841, Tomes posted an article to tell the whole world about his discovery of new forceps that had never been seen before, successfully becoming the creator of the forceps and the concept of forceps. In earlier times, or during the eighteenth and nineteenth centuries, elevators and pelicans were used as extraction devices because the idea of dental forceps did not exist, but the thought of extracting in the first place with some form of a tool was there. With pelicans, their sharp talons were used to be placed down on the inside of the mouth near the gums while the elevator helped pull the tooth out of its socket. Then, a pair of pincers would do the rest of the job, wiggling the tooth out of the gum until the extraction was complete. The functionality of today's dental forceps come from the need to remove items from the mouth such as the cotton balls dentists place next to a patient's teeth or the rubber bands a patient needs for their braces. However, most dental forceps are not designed for comfort, nor do they take the account of the dental practitioners hand positions throughout the procedure to mind. Dental forceps have been designed to the point where dentists experience medical complications of their own on the carpal scale considering their hands are always placed in an awkward angle while they remove items from the patient's mouth.

List of dental forceps
Bayonet
Cow horns #23
Greyhound
Lower universals
Root
Upper canine
Upper left molar
Upper right molar
Upper straight long
Upper straight short
Upper universal fine
Upper universals
Upper wisdom tooth

Elevators
Cogswell-A & B elevators
Coupland's elevators
Crane root tip elevators
Crossbar apex luxators
Cryer elevators
Flat elevators
Heidbrink root tip elevators
Miller's apex luxators
Molts elevators
Narrow and wide, straight and curved luxators
Periosteal elevators
Potts elevators
Root-tip pick elevator
Warwick James elevators
Winter elevators

Chisels
Osteotome

Orthodontic instruments
Band pusher
Band setter
Bird beak pliers
Bracket holder
Bracket tweezer
Cinch back
Distal end cutters
Elastics
Hemostat/Mathieu pliers
Tucker

Endodontic instruments
Apex locator
Endodontic explorer
Finger pluggers
Finger spreader
Gates glidden burs
Guttapercha retrieval files
Endodontic files and reamers
Broken instrument retrieval files
Controlled memory flexible files
Hedstrom or H-files
K-files
Manual tapered files
McSpadden files
NiTi flex files
Pathfinder files
Rotary tapered files
Lentulo spiral
Masserans kit
Microscope
Peeso reamer burs
Post and core kit

See also
 Dentist
 Dental auxiliary
 Dentistry

References

Dental equipment
Dental materials
Medical equipment